Ricardo Ramsey "Richard" Divila (30 May 1945 – 25 April 2020) was a Brazilian motorsports designer. He worked in Formula One, Formula Two, Formula Three, Formula 3000 and sports car racing.

Life and career 
Divila was born in São Paulo. He had a very close relationship with Wilson and Emerson Fittipaldi. He started by designing Formula Vee and various sports cars for them in Brazil in the 1960s. When the brothers established the Fittipaldi Automotive team in Formula One he became the technical director and designed the team's first three cars. These three cars had the name "FD" based on Fittipaldi's "F" and Divila's "D" like the Brabham's "BT" (Jack Brabham and Ron Tauranac). He remained with the team until it closed down in 1982.

Afterwards, he worked for many teams in many categories - in particular with Ligier in Formula One and with Nissan in various sports car series. Between 1988 and 1989, he designed a Formula One car for Lamberto Leoni, a former F1 driver who intended to enter his FIRST GP team in the  championship. Although the team had contracts with Judd and Pirelli as engine and tyre suppliers, and with Gabriele Tarquini as a driver, the team did not race that year. It was Divila's last chance to see an F1 car designed by him racing, especially as his designs were altered to become the L190 run by the short-lived Life Racing Engines.

From the 1990s, he worked for some Japanese racing teams such as Nismo, SARD, and Dome.

He died in France, aged 74.

References

External links
www.teamdan.com 
Ricardo Divila on Twitter

1945 births
2020 deaths
Formula One designers
Brazilian motorsport people
Sportspeople from São Paulo